The 2022 season for  is the 19th season in the team's existence, the 12th as a UCI ProTeam, and the third under the current name.  They use Canyon bicycles, Shimano drivetrain, Shimano wheels and EKOI clothing.

The team had finished as the second-best UCI ProTeam in the 2021 season behind , and will receive automatic invitations to all 2022 UCI World Tour events. In previous years, with 19 UCI WorldTeams, only the best-placed UCI ProTeam from the previous season would receive automatic invitations to all UCI World Tour events that season.

Team roster 

Riders who joined the team for the 2022 season

Riders who left the team during or after the 2021 season

Season victories

National, Continental, and World Champions

Notes

References

External links 

 

2022 road cycling season by team
2022
2022 in French sport